Thomas Frankland may refer to:

 Sir Thomas Frankland, 2nd Baronet (1665–1726), English Member of Parliament
 Sir Thomas Frankland, 3rd Baronet (c. 1685–1747), English Member of Parliament
 Sir Thomas Frankland, 5th Baronet (1718–1784), British naval officer, MP and slave trader
 Sir Thomas Frankland, 6th Baronet (1750–1831), British landowner and MP
 Sir Thomas Frankland Lewis, 1st Baronet (1780–1855), British Poor Law Commissioner and MP